Magni Jarnskor (born 16 November 1968) is a retired Faroese football midfielder.

References

1968 births
Living people
Faroese footballers
GÍ Gøta players
Association football midfielders
Faroe Islands international footballers